Masoud Hajji-Zavareh (born May 16, 1988 in Kermanshah, Iran) is an Iranian taekwondo practitioner. He won the gold medal in the lightweight division (74 kg) at the 2014 Asian Games in Incheon, South Korea.

References

External links
 

Iranian male taekwondo practitioners
1988 births
Living people
Asian Games gold medalists for Iran
Asian Games medalists in taekwondo
Taekwondo practitioners at the 2014 Asian Games
Medalists at the 2014 Asian Games
Sportspeople from Kermanshah
World Taekwondo Championships medalists
Asian Taekwondo Championships medalists
21st-century Iranian people